Ovidiu Maier (born 2 February 1971) is a Romanian professional footballer who plays for CS Ocna Mureş. A precocious talent, Maier was given the nickname Motanul (The Tomcat), a name that stuck with him throughout his career. In summer 2022 he has been replaced by Radu Andone as manager of CS Inter Unirea.

Honours
ASA 1962 Târgu Mureș
Divizia B: 1990–91
Rapid București
Divizia A: 1998–99
Cupa României: 1997–98
Supercupa României: 1999
Apulum Alba Iulia
Divizia B: 2002–03

References

External links
 

1971 births
Living people
People from Ocna Mureș
Romanian footballers
People from Alba County
Liga I players
Liga II players
ASA Târgu Mureș (1962) players
FC Inter Sibiu players
FC Universitatea Cluj players
ACF Gloria Bistrița players
FC Rapid București players
CSM Unirea Alba Iulia players
Association football midfielders